Sergei Aleksandrovich Tonkikh (born 16 May 1986) is a Russian former professional football player.

Club career
He made his Russian Football National League debut for FC Avangard Kursk on 18 April 2006 in a game against FC Mashuk-KMV Pyatigorsk.

External links
 

1986 births
People from Manturovsky District, Kursk Oblast
Living people
Russian footballers
FC Salyut Belgorod players
Association football defenders
FC Avangard Kursk players
FC Dynamo Bryansk players
FC Energomash Belgorod players
FC Sever Murmansk players
Sportspeople from Kursk Oblast